Temalangeni Mbali Dlamini (born July 16, 1987 in Mbabane) is a Swazi sprinter. She represented Swaziland at the 2008 Summer Olympics in Beijing,  where she became the nation's flag bearer at the opening ceremony. Dlamini competed in the women's 400 metres, where she finished last in the seventh and final heat, with a time of 59.91 seconds. She also achieved her best result at the 2007 IAAF World Championships in Osaka, Japan, with a personal best time of 58.27 seconds.

References

External links

NBC 2008 Olympics profile

Swazi female sprinters
Living people
Olympic athletes of Eswatini
Athletes (track and field) at the 2008 Summer Olympics
People from Mbabane
1987 births
Swazi female middle-distance runners
Olympic female sprinters